The Port of Ozamiz or Ozamiz Port, is a seaport in Ozamiz City, Misamis Occidental, Philippines. Located in Panguil Bay, it is one of the major gateway ports in the Philippines. It is managed by and the baseport of Philippine Ports Authority - Port Management Office Misamis Occidental/Ozamiz.

History
On June 9, 1961, President Carlos P. Garcia established Ozamiz Port as a subport of entry of Cagayan de Oro City. On July 22, 1993, President Fidel V. Ramos placed the port under the administrative jurisdiction of the Philippine Ports Authority.

Passenger Line
 Manila - 2Go
 Cebu - 2Go, Cokaliong Shipping Lines, Trans-Asia Shipping
 Iligan City - 2Go
 Mukas, Kolambugan, Lanao del Norte - Daima Shipping Lines

Statistics

Passenger Movement

Container Traffic

Cargo Throughput

Shipcalls

References

Ozamiz Port
Buildings and structures in Ozamiz
Transportation in Mindanao
 Misamis Occidental